The Kastelhorn (also known as Punta del Castel) is a mountain of the Lepontine Alps, located on the border between Switzerland and Italy. It lies north of the Basòdino.

References

External links
 Kastelhorn on Hikr

Alpine three-thousanders
Mountains of Piedmont
Mountains of Ticino
Mountains of the Alps
Italy–Switzerland border
International mountains of Europe
Lepontine Alps
Mountains of Switzerland